Suk Suk (the title means "Uncle" in Cantonese)  is a 2019 award-winning and critically acclaimed Hong Kong drama film written and directed by Ray Yeung. It presents the story of two secretly homosexual married men in their twilight years. The film was selected to compete in the Panorama section at the 70th Berlin International Film Festival.

Plot 
Pak, a 70-year-old taxi driver who refuses to retire, meets Hoi, a retired 65-year-old single father at a park. Despite the families that they had built, the encounter sparks a desire that they had both suppressed and leads to a contemplation of a life together.

Cast
 Tai Bo as Pak
 Ben Yuen as Hoi
 Patra Au as Ching
 Lo Chun-Yip as Wan
 To Kong as Chiu
 Lam Yiu-Sing as Edmond
 Wong Hiu-Yee as Fong
 Hu Yixin as Zheng
 Kwan Lau-Ting as Joyce
 Chu Wai-Keung as Dior

Release 

 Suk Suk had its world premiere at the 24th Busan International Film Festival on 4 October 2019.
 Suk Suk was released in Taiwan by Cai Chang International in February 2020
 Suk Suk was released in Hong Kong by Golden Scene Company Ltd. in May 2020
 Suk Suk was released in Thailand by M Pictures / Never So Small in July 2020 
 The Hong Kong Economic and Trade Office in Brussels (HKETO, Brussels) and Create Hong Kong have jointly supported the participation of three Hong Kong films at the CinemAsia Film Festival 2020 in Amsterdam, the Netherlands, being held from March 4 to 8 (Amsterdam time). One of the three Hong Kong films is Suk Suk.
Suk Suk was released in North America by Strand Releasing in February 2021.
Suk Suk was released in Spain by Vitrine Filmes in July 2021
Suk Suk was released in Brazil by Vitrine Filmes in September 2021 
The original title "Suk Suk" was changed to "Twilight's Kiss" for USA and Canada by North American distributor Strand Releasing.

The original title "Suk Suk" was changed to "Un Printemps a Hong Kong" for France by French distributor Epicentre Films.

The original title "Suk Suk" was changed to "Suk Suk - Um Amor em Segredo" for Brazil by Brazilian distributor Vitrine Filmes

Reception 
According to Metacritic, which sampled six critics and calculated a weighted average score of 71 out of 100, the film received "generally favorable reviews".

Elizabeth Kerr from The Hollywood Reporter describes Suk Suk as Ray Yeung's "most accomplished, mature film to date, and Yeung demonstrates a keen eye for the social dynamics that impact us and how we respond to them, and finds space to bask in the simple pleasures, basic generosity and the safety net that is family while simultaneously dealing with homophobia, ageism and faith." Wendy Ide from Screen Daily described Suk Suk as "a gentle, understated storytelling with subtly observant camerawork to match". Zhuo-Ning Su from The Film Stage writes, "In lucid, carefully non-judgmental strokes, Yeung recreates the easy familiarity of (hetero-normative) family life that both men have gotten used to."   Sight & Sound indicates, "Suk Suk is a loving, considerate tale of queer love in later life. Elaborating an affair between two elderly men in present-day Hong Kong, Ray Yeung proves himself as an astute observer of human affection and social obligation in his third feature film."  Alissa Simon from Variety describes, "Strong performances by veterans Tai Bo and Ben Yuen make the protagonists’ struggle concrete and affecting."

Awards and nominations

Soundtrack

References

External links 
 
Production website:  New Voice Film Productions

2019 films
2010s Cantonese-language films
Hong Kong LGBT-related films
Hong Kong drama films
LGBT-related drama films
2019 LGBT-related films
2010s Hong Kong films